Bubblehouse is an EP released by experimental jazz funk organ trio Medeski Martin & Wood.

Track listing 
All music by Medeski Martin & Wood.

 "Bubblehouse" – 4:17
 "Bubblehouse BBQ Mix" – 6:28
 "Dracula" (remix) – 3:45
 "Macha" – 3:19
 "Spy Kiss" – 6:58

Performers 
 John Medeski – Hammond B3 organ, clavinet, Wurlitzer electric piano, Pianet T
 Billy Martin – drums, percussion
 Chris Wood – acoustic bass
 We/DJ Olive – Remix (Tracks 2 and 4 only)
 John Zorn – Alto Saxophone (Track 3 only)
 DJ Logic – Remix (Track 3 only)

Credits 
 "Bubblehouse" and "Spy Kiss" remixed for MMW by We at the Illbient Impound, Chinatown, NYC
 Mixed engineered and produced by We/DJ Olive, Loop, Once 11
 "Dracula" remixed by DJ Logic including saxophone by John Zorn
 Recorded and mixed by Scott Harding, assisted by Djinji Brown, at Greene Street Recording, SoHo, NYC
 "Macha" recorded by David Baker at the Shack, Hawaii
 Additional recording and mixing by David Baker and Bob Ward at Current Sounds, NYC.
 Mastered by David Baker and Duncan Standbury at the Master Cutting Room, NYC
 Production coordination: Liz Penta/LP Management
 Band photo: Michael Macioce
 Artwork: Billy Martin

References 

1997 EPs
Gramavision Records EPs
Medeski Martin & Wood EPs